Rasika Priyadarshana (born 23 November 1975) is a Sri Lankan former cricketer. He played in 137 first-class and 57 List A matches between 1993/94 and 2011/12. In January 2003, Priyadarshana was summoned by a disciplinary committee due to a code of conduct breach, for which he was handed a two-match ban, suspended for one year.

References

External links
 

1975 births
Living people
Sri Lankan cricketers
Badureliya Sports Club cricketers
Lankan Cricket Club cricketers
Matara Sports Club cricketers
Moors Sports Club cricketers
Ragama Cricket Club cricketers
Singha Sports Club cricketers
Tamil Union Cricket and Athletic Club cricketers
Place of birth missing (living people)